Spades Wharf Island is a small island in the Susquehanna River in Lower Swatara Township, Dauphin County, Pennsylvania, near Highspire, Pennsylvania. Near the Harrisburg International Airport, the island itself is part of the Pennsylvania State Game Lands and is known for its small shape.

External links
Game Lands Number 275 USGS Steelton Quad, Pennsylvania, Topographic Map

Islands of the Allegheny River in Pennsylvania
Landforms of Dauphin County, Pennsylvania